The 37th Indian Infantry Brigade was an Infantry formation of the Indian Army during the Second World War. It was formed in June 1941, at Quetta in India and assigned to the 14th Indian Infantry Division. The brigade was then assigned to the 23rd Indian Infantry Division in June 1942. It remained with the 23rd Division apart from an attachment to the 17th Indian Infantry Division between March and April 1944.

After the end of the Second World War, it took part in the British occupation of Indonesia during the Indonesian National Revolution.

Formation
3rd Battalion, 5th Gurkha Rifles 
3rd Battalion, 3rd Gurkha Rifles
3rd Battalion, 10th Gurkha Rifles

See also

 List of Indian Army Brigades in World War II

References

Brigades of India in World War II
Military units and formations in Burma in World War II